Jake Sully, or Tsyeyk te Suli in the Naʼvi language, is a fictional character and main protagonist of the American science fiction film series Avatar, created by James Cameron. Jake Sully served with the U.S. Marine Corps 1st Reconnaissance Battalion but was discharged after an injury left him paralyzed from the waist down. After learning that his identical twin brother Tom has died, Jake agrees to replace him in the RDA's Avatar Program on Pandora, where humans remotely control human/Na'vi hybrids to safely navigate the planet. Lost in the Pandoran woods, Jake is attacked by a group of viperwolves when Neytiri, a Na'vi, saves him. Jake turns against the RDA after sympathizing with the Na'vi and mating with Neytiri. Jake becomes the sixth Toruk Makto and leads the Na'vi in a battle to drive the RDA off Pandora. After the battle, Jake's consciousness is permanently transferred into his avatar via the Tree of Souls. Over the following fifteen years, Jake has three children with Neytiri: Neteyam, Lo'ak, and Tuk, and adopts two others: Kiri and Miles "Spider" Socorro.

The character is portrayed by Sam Worthington in Avatar (2009) and its sequels, including Avatar: The Way of Water (2022) and the currently untitled upcoming Avatar 3. He also appears in literature, including comic books published by Dark Horse Comics.

Production history

Casting 
James Cameron offered the role to Matt Damon, with a 10% stake in the film's profits, but Damon turned the film down because of his commitment to The Bourne Ultimatum.  Other notable actors who auditioned for the part include Chris Pratt and Chris Pine with the studio pushing Jake Gyllenhaal to play the role. Ultimately, the three finalists for the role were Channing Tatum, Chris Evans, and Sam Worthington, with Cameron ultimately going with Worthington based on his read of the climactic speech, saying:
Worthington, who was living in his car at the time, auditioned twice early in development, and signed on for the film's sequels. Cameron felt that because Worthington had not done a major film, he would give the character "a quality that is really real". Cameron said he "has that quality of being a guy you'd want to have a beer with, and he ultimately becomes a leader who transforms the world".

Appearances

Films

Avatar (2009) 

Jake Sully served with the U.S. Marine Corps but was discharged after receiving a severe spinal injury during a service in Venezuela, which left him paralyzed from the waist down. The Resources Development Administration (RDA) inform Jake that his twin brother Tom was killed. Due to their identical genetics, the RDA offer him the opportunity to take his brother's place in the RDA's Avatar Program on Pandora, an Earth-like moon in Alpha Centauri inhabited by the Na'vi; the Avatar Program involves creating human/Na'vi hybrid clones that are genetically linked to their human "pilots", meaning that Jake can control his brother's avatar due to them being twins.

Arriving on Pandora, Dr. Grace Augustine, head of the Avatar Program, considers Sully an inadequate replacement for Tom but accepts his assignment as a bodyguard. While escorting the avatars of Grace and fellow scientist Dr. Norm Spellman, Jake's avatar is attacked by a thanator. Fleeing into the forest, Jake is rescued by Neytiri, a female Na'vi. Witnessing an auspicious sign, she takes him to her clan.  Mo'at, Neytiri's mother and the clan's spiritual leader, orders her daughter to initiate Jake into their society. Taking advantage of his new position, Colonel Miles Quaritch, head of RDA's private security force, promises to pay for an operation that would give him the ability to walk again, in exchange for giving information about the Na'vi. After learning of this, Grace transfers herself, Jake, and Norm to an outpost.

Over the next three months, Jake falls in love with Neytiri and begins sympathizing with the Na'vi. Jake reveals his change of allegiance when attempting to disable a bulldozer that threatens to destroy a sacred Na'vi site.  Quaritch shows a video recording of Jake's attack on the bulldozer and another where he admits that the Na'vi will never abandon Hometree to Administrator Parker Selfridge, who orders them to destroy Hometree. Jake asks Selfridge to give him one hour to convince the Na'vi to evacuate before commencing the attack.

Jake confesses to the Na'vi that he was a spy, and they take him and Grace captive as Quaritch's men destroy Hometree. In the midst of the chaos, Mo'at frees Jake and Grace, who are then detached from their avatars and imprisoned by the RDA. Disgusted by Quaritch's brutality, pilot Trudy Chacón frees Jake, Grace, and Norm, and airlifts them to Grace's outpost, but Grace is shot by Quaritch during the escape. To regain the Na'vi's trust, Jake connects his mind to Toruk, a dragon-like predator who is feared and honored by the Na'vi. Finding the refugees at the sacred Tree of Souls, Jake pleads with Mo'at to heal Grace and transfer her human body into her avatar with the aid of the Tree of Souls, but she dies before the process can be completed. Supported by new chief Tsu'tey, Jake unites the clan and tells them to gather all of the clans to battle the RDA. During the subsequent battle, the Na'vi suffer heavy casualties, but are rescued when Pandoran wildlife unexpectedly join the attack and overwhelm the humans, which Neytiri interprets as Eywa's answer to Jake's prayer. Jake destroys a makeshift bomber before it can reach the Tree of Souls. Meanwhile, Quaritch, wearing an AMP suit, escapes from his own damaged aircraft, then later finds and breaks open the avatar link unit containing Jake's human body, exposing it to Pandora's poisonous atmosphere. Quaritch prepares to slit the throat of Jake's avatar, but Neytiri kills Quaritch and saves Jake from suffocation, seeing his human form for the first time. With the exceptions of Jake, Norm and a select few others, all humans are expelled from Pandora and are sent back to Earth. Jake is permanently transferred into his avatar with the aid of the Tree of Souls.

Avatar: The Way of Water (2022) 

More than a decade after the Na'vi repelled the human invasion of Pandora, Jake Sully lives as chief of the Omaticaya clan and has raised a family with Neytiri including sons Neteyam te Suli Tsyeyk'itan (Neteyam Sully) and Lo'ak te Suli Tsyeyk'itan (Lo'ak Sully), daughter Tuktirey "Tuk" te Suli Neytiri'ite (Tuk Sully), adopted daughter Kiri te Suli Kìreysì'ite (Kiri Sully) who was born from Grace Augustine's inert avatar, and a human boy named Miles Quaritch "Spider" Socorro, the son of Colonel Miles Quaritch who was unable to be transported to Earth due to his young age. The RDA return to Pandora and erect a new main operating base named Bridgehead City to prepare Pandora for colonization. Also arriving are Recombinants, Na'vi avatars implanted with the minds and memories of deceased RDA marines including Quaritch, who serves as their leader.

Jake initiates a guerilla campaign against the RDA supply lines, but Quaritch captures his children. Jake and Neytiri arrive and free most of them, but Spider is taken by Quaritch, who recognizes him as his son. Aware of the danger Spider's knowledge of his whereabouts poses to their safety, Jake and his family exile themselves from the Omaticaya and retreat to the Metkayina reef people clan at Pandora's eastern seaboard, where they are given shelter, even though some tribesmen consider them to have "demon blood" for their genetic human heritage. The family learns the ways of the reef people, Kiri develops a spiritual bond with the sea and its creatures, and Lo'ak befriends Tsireya, the daughter of clan chief Tonowari and his wife Ronal.

Tsireya's brother Aonung and his friends entice Lo'ak to a trip into the territory of a dangerous sea predator and leave him stranded. Lo'ak is saved and befriends a tulkun named Payakan. Kiri attempts to link with the Metkayina's Spirit Tree but suffers a violent seizure, prompting Jake to call Norm Spellman and Max Patel for help, inadvertently allowing to RDA to track them down to where the Metkayina live. Quaritch commandeers a whaling vessel and begins to brutally kill tulkuns in order to draw Jake out.

Learning of the tulkun killings, Lo'ak takes off to warn Payakan, followed by his siblings, Tsireya, Aonung, and Rotxo. They find him being chased by the whalers, and Lo'ak, Tsireya, and Tuk are captured by Quaritch. With their children in danger, Jake, Neytiri, and the Metkayina set out to confront the humans. Quaritch forces Jake to surrender, but upon seeing Lo'ak imperiled, Payakan attacks the whalers, triggering a fight that critically damages the vessel, causing it to sink. Neteyam rescues Lo'ak, Tsireya and Spider, but is fatally shot. Jake faces Quaritch, who uses Kiri as a hostage, only resisting when Neytiri does the same with Spider.

Jake, Quaritch, Neytiri, and Tuk end up trapped inside the sinking vessel. Jake strangles Quaritch into unconsciousness and is rescued by Lo'ak and Payakan, while Kiri summons sea creatures to help her save Neytiri and Tuk. Spider finds and rescues Quaritch, but renounces his cruelty and rejoins Jake's family. At Neteyam's funeral, Tonowari respectfully identifies Jake and his family as part of the Metkayina and welcomes his family to stay, with Jake vowing to keep fighting the human invaders.

Literature

Avatar: The Next Shadow (2021) 
Shortly after the events of the Avatar, Jake has the Na'vi give his human body a traditional burial and moves the Omaticaya Clan near Hell's Gate to be close to the human allies who were allowed to stay on Pandora. Two weeks later, Jake still visits his former body's burial site, envisioning himself as a human. Neytiri informs him she must go help the Olangi Clan, who had suffered the most casualties from the war. Jake, thinking about how the other clan's belief in him is getting shaky, agrees with her and sees her off.

Jake confides in Mo'at his lack of self-confidence as clan leader and the guilt he faces for the destruction of Hometree. Mo'at assures Jake that he is stronger than he thinks, and that their new home and him becoming Toruk Makto was Eywa's will. Tsu'tey's parents, Artsut and Ateyo, arrive with their other son, Arvok, who challenges Jake's position as Olo'eyktan by invoking First Blood. Jake agrees to fight Arvok despite Mo'at warning that the ritual is dangerous. Jake easily defeats Arvok by cutting his arm and drawing blood. Angry about his loss, Arvok throws his knife at Jake, who catches it, but gets poisoned and collapses into a coma.

In his coma, Jake has nightmares where he is tormented by the deceased Miles Quaritch and Tsu'tey, until he unintentionally makes tsaheylu with the Tree of Souls and is transported into the Pandoran Neural Network. The manifested spirits of Eytukan and Tsu'tey urge him to forgive himself for his mistakes and offer guidance. Tsu'tey reveals Artsut and Ateyo's plan to Jake, explaining that although their actions were wrong, they had the interests of the Omaticaya at heart. Jake decides that he will punish them for their wrongdoings, while also being merciful towards them in doing so.

Awaking from his coma, Jake exiles Artsut and Ateyo for their assassination attempt. After they leave, he gathers the Omaticaya, promising to do his best and lead them to a better future. Neytiri returns and finds Jake at the gravesite. Neytiri comments that he doesn't seem like himself, but Jake reassures her that he has never felt more like himself and leaves his human body behind.

Avatar: The High Ground (2022) 
Years after the events of Avatar, Jake and Neytiri have settled and have created a family, and are trying to keep peace in their family, but Jake still worries that the humans will return while everyone else believes he is just paranoid, and believe that Eywa chased the humans away the first time, and she will do the same this time around.

Merchandise 
Mattel made action figures of Jake Sully as part of their range of Avatar action figures. The variants included: Avatar Jake Sully, Avatar Jake Sully (Clothes) and Avatar Jake Sully (Warrior). He was also included in a range of Avatar toys produced for McDonald's Happy Meals. In 2022, McFarlane Toys began releasing toys based on the Avatar franchise, among them include a Jake Sully action figure, an action figure of Jake riding his banshee, a set of Jake fighting the thanator, and a set of Jake in the Omatikaya rainforest.  They will be releasing an additional three toys to coincide with the release of Avatar: The Way of Water. Further, in November 2022, Funko announced they would be releasing two Pop! Vinyl toys based on Jake Sully, one which shows him in his basic avatar body and the other of him as Toruk Makto. Lego has produced Minifigures of Jake Sully for its Lego Avatar theme. Of the ten sets released so far, Sully appears in 4 of them, with 5 minifigures representing his human form and his Avatar's various looks throughout both films. Lego has also made two BrickHeadz depicting his human and Avatar forms.

In other media 
 Sully appears in the 2010 porn parody/spiritual sequel film This Ain't Avatar, portrayed by Chris Johnson.
 In the 2011 The Simpsons "Treehouse of Horror XXII" segment "In the Na'vi", a parody of Avatar, Jake's role is filled by an adult Bart Simpson, voiced by Nancy Cartwright, who (in his avatar body) ends up getting Kang's daughter Kamala (a parody of Neytiri) pregnant after falling in love with her, before leading the species of the planet against the military after Milhouse (who was also in an avatar body) calls them there as they were supposed to retrieve the location of the sacred Hilarrium. In the aftermath of the conflict, Bart learns that Kang and Kodos would have freely given the military the Hilarrium they were looking for if they had just asked. Bart's avatar form was subsequently featured as an unlockable character in the freemium city-building mobile game The Simpsons: Tapped Out, with Cartwright reprising her role.

Reception 
For his performance in Avatar, Worthington won the Saturn Award for Best Actor for his performance as Sully at the 36th Saturn Awards.

In 2022, Worthington was nominated for the Washington D.C. Area Film Critics Association award for Best Motion Capture Performance for his performance in Avatar: The Way of Water. However, the award ultimately ended up going to his co-star Zoe Saldana.

Family tree

References 
  Text was copied from Jake Sully at Avatar Wiki, which is released under a Creative Commons Attribution-Share Alike 3.0 (Unported) (CC-BY-SA 3.0) license.

Action film characters
Adventure film characters
Avatar (franchise)
Characters created by James Cameron
Fictional bodyguards
Fictional characters with paraplegia
Fictional characters with post-traumatic stress disorder
Fictional corporals
Fictional cryonically preserved characters
Fictional extraterrestrial–human hybrids
Fictional identical twins
Fictional mercenaries
Fictional military personnel in films
Fictional people from the 22nd-century
Fictional refugees
Fictional soldiers
Fictional tribal chiefs
Fictional United States Marine Corps personnel
Fictional war veterans
Fictional astrobiologists
Film characters introduced in 2009
Male characters in film
Science fiction film characters